Meshwork is the name of the fourth album by German band X Marks the Pedwalk. It was released by Zoth Ommog in Europe and Cleopatra Records in North America, both in CD format.

Summary
This album expanded on the stylistic change that had begun with X Marks the Pedwalk's previous stand-alone single, Facer.  In an issue of Sideline magazine, André Schmechta commented: "Many fans were not happy with my [X Marks the Pedwalk's] new style! But on the other hand many listeners also rated the new stuf [sic] as the best XMTP work ever...For us the most important thing is to do the music we wanted to do and secondly that the "normal" audience can approach XMTP..."

Track listing
 "Meshwork M.1" – 5:22
 "Monomaniac" – 6:19
 "Free and Alive" – 6:53
 "Special Sign" – 7:02
 "Emotion" – 7:14
 "Never Look Back" – 5:42
 "T.O.L." – 6:10
 "N-a-lyse" – 6:22
 "Meshwork Y.2" – 4:40

Personnel
Sevren Ni-arb
Raive Yarx
Estefania

External links
Entry at official X Marks the Pedwalk website.
Entry at Discogs.com.

References 

1995 albums
X Marks the Pedwalk albums
Cleopatra Records albums
Zoth Ommog Records albums